Jolán Babus (October 17, 1917 – May 5, 1967) was a Hungarian ethnographer and teacher.

Life
She was born in Košice, which is now part of Slovakia. In 1920 her family moved to Lónya, where her father was a Calvinist priest.  From 1936 she attended to the Teacher College of Debrecen where she taught Faculty of Arts. In 1943 she is a member of the National Museum of Ethnography. In 1952 she founded the Grammar-school and the dormitory in Vásárosnamény. She was the founder of the Museum Bereg. The last year he worked in Szekszárd, in the Museum Sárrét. Babus died there, but she was buried in Lónya.

Works
Kender- és lenmunkák a beregmegyei Lónyán (Népr. Közl., 1957)
Nádvágás és tetőfedés a Bereg megyei Lónyán
A lónyai vizek néprajza (Népr. Közl., 1959).
Adalékok a lónyai aratáshoz
Adatok a vásárosnaményi és gergelyiugornyai halászathoz
Tiszaháti falucsúfolók. 1955. 
Néprajzi tanulmányok a beregi Tiszahátról
Közmondások és szólások a Bereg megyei Lónyáról

1917 births
1967 deaths
Writers from Košice
Czechoslovak emigrants to Hungary
Ethnographers
Women educators
Hungarian educators